Giuseppe Eskenazi (born 1939, in Istanbul) has been described as the world’s most important dealer in Chinese works of art. His company, Eskenazi (art gallery), has sold to more than eighty of the world’s major museums, as well as numerous private collectors. He opened a London office with his late father in 1960, originally buying for the family's antiques business in Milan.  In 1972 he opened a gallery at Foxglove House, Piccadilly, with an inaugural exhibition of Early Chinese Ceramics and Works of Art.

In 1993 he opened a purpose built 6-floor gallery on Clifford Street in Mayfair, London and also formed part of the steering committee that established Asian Art in London, later acting as Chairman for the event in 2002 and 2003.  Between 1993 and 2007 he served on the Asia House Executive Committee and between 1998 and 2002 he was on the Council for the Oriental Ceramic Society.  He was a Trustee of the Asia House Trust (London), 2000-2007, an advisor to the board of Bard Graduate Center in New York, 2000 to 2015, and an advisor to the Royal Academy of Art for the exhibitions 100 Masterpieces of Imperial Chinese Ceramics from the Au Bak Ling Collection (1998) and Return of the Buddha, The Qingzhou Discoveries (2002).

In 2006 he was awarded appointed a Chevalier of the Legion d’Honneur for services to the arts, and in particular for supplying remarkable works of art to the great museums of the world. In 2012, he published ‘A Dealer’s Hand: The Chinese Art World Through the Eyes of Giuseppe Eskenazi’. It was published in Chinese in 2015 and a second Chinese edition was released in 2017. He speaks six languages.

References

External links
 www.eskenazi.co.uk/

British art dealers
1939 births
20th-century Sephardi Jews
Turkish Sephardi Jews
Businesspeople from Istanbul
Living people
Turkish emigrants to the United Kingdom